SQL Server Agent is a component of Microsoft SQL Server which schedules jobs and handles other automated tasks.  It runs as a Windows service so it can start automatically when the system boots or it can be started manually.

Typical system tasks performed include scheduling maintenance plans (such as backups), handling Reporting Services subscriptions and performing log shipping sub-tasks (backup, copy, restore & check).  User tasks, such as scheduling some T-SQL or command line statement are also common.

SQLAgent has support for operators and alerts, so that administrators can be notified, e.g. by email.

References

Relational database management systems
SQL
Microsoft database software
Microsoft server technology